Royal Potato Family is an American independent record label based in Brooklyn, New York. The label's roster includes Marco Benevento, Seth Walker, American Babies, Robert Walter, Holly Bowling, Lukas Nelson, Neal Casal, Mike Dillon, Allison Miller, Superhuman Happiness, and Nolatet. The label was founded in early 2009 by Kevin Calabro and Marco Benevento.

History 
Royal Potato Family was created in 2009 by musician Marco Benevento and his manager/publicist Kevin Calabro as a method to release Benevento's music.  Since Benevento's album Me Not Me, the label has added many other artists of varied musical genres, yet who are aligned with the founders' philosophy. "I’d like to think what makes us appealing to other artists as a home for their releases is that we’ve maintained our integrity over the years. We still honestly believe that music can make the world a better place. We want these records to be a soundtrack to people’s lives,” Calabro told NPR. According to Jambase, Royal Potato Family "has built a roster of artists and delivered a catalog of releases worthy of taking note."

Royal Potato Family records is staffed across the United States.

The name Royal Potato Family came from a joke that Bob Dylan told Benevento's original drummer Matt Chamberlain.

Kevin Calabro recorded a TED Talk about "The Music Turns You On" at TEDxChichester, February 18, 2011.

On May 10, 2017, Calabro appeared on the Publicity Panel at the Relix magazine first-ever Live Music Conference at the Brooklyn Bowl in New York.

Current artists  
Source
6 String Drag
Allison Miller
American Babies
Ben Goldberg
Billy Martin & Wil Blades
Burnell Pines
Decker
DRKWAV
Edward David Anderson 
Evolfo
Garage A Trois
Grayson Capps
Holly Bowling
Jacob Fred Jazz Odyssey 
Jenny Scheinmen
Kirk Knuffke
Leslie Mendelson
Lukas Nelson & Promise of the Real
Marco Benevento
Matt Chamberlain & Brian Haas
Mike Dillon 
Nathan Moore
Neal Casal
Nolatet
Reed Mathis
Robert Walter’s 20th Congress
Seth Walker
Skerik
Stanton Moore
Steven Bernstein
Superhuman Happiness
The Dead Kenny G’s
The New Mastersounds
Todd Clouser’s A Love Electric
Wil Blades
Willie Sugarcapps
WOLF! Featuring Scott Metzger
Yellowbirds

Discography

References

External links
Official website
Discogs

American record labels
American independent record labels
Record labels established in 2009
Jazz record labels
Rock 'n Roll Records albums